The Durham University Library is the centrally administered library of Durham University in England and is part of the university's Library and Collections department. It was founded in January 1833 at Palace Green by a 160 volume donation by the then Bishop of Durham, William Van Mildert, and now holds over 1.6 million printed items. Since 1937, the university library has incorporated the historic Cosin's Library, founded by Bishop Cosin in 1669. Cosin's Library and the Sudan Archive held at Palace Green Library are designated collections under Arts Council England's Designation Scheme for collections of national and international significance; two collections at Durham University Oriental Museum (also part of Library and Collections as well as the Durham Residential Research Library), the Chinese collection and the Egyptian collection, are also designated.

The library is a member of the Society of College, National and University Libraries (SCONUL), Research Libraries UK and the Association of European Research Libraries. It partners with Durham Cathedral Library and Ushaw College Library in the Durham Residential Research Library.

History

Cosin's Library

After the donation by Bishop William Van Mildert, a suitable location to house the library's stock had to be founded and thus a new gallery was constructed inside Cosin's Library (a diocesan library on Palace Green founded in 1669 by Bishop John Cosin) in 1834. Cosin's Library, and its collection of medieval manuscripts and early printed books came under the trusteeship of the university library in 1937.

Cosin's Library is a grade II* listed building and an ancient monument, and is located inside the Durham Castle and Cathedral UNESCO World Heritage Site. The internal architecture and decoration are also of international importance. The original portrait panels located above the bookshelves were painted by Jan Baptist van Eerssell in 1668–1669. Further portraits hang in the library, including half portraits of English statesmen. Nearly three hundred years later, a former university librarian, David Ramage, completed Cosin's original plan for the library by painting further portrait panels for the smaller room added in 1670–1671.

Expansion
Additional bequeathed or donated collections during the 1850s (most notably by Martin Routh in 1854, Edward Maltby in 1856 and Thomas Mastermann Winterbottom in 1859) led to a further expansion of the library, with the upper two floors of the Exchequer Building (former Bishoprick Law Courts from 1450) being occupied. As the library's stock further expanded, more space was gradually needed, with a nineteenth-century lecture block eventually becoming part of the library. A major extension to the Palace Green Library in 1966 designed by architect George Pace provided a reading room and new storage space for the University Library. With no possibility of further expansion on the peninsula, the decision was taken to extend the library building on the university's science site, which became the Main Library in 1983.

Recent history

The university library introduced its first online circulation system in 1983. The Main Library won a SCONUL Library Design Award in 1988 and the online cataloguing of the library's stock beginning in 1990. In 1996 the Durham University Library joined Research Libraries UK.

The university library was expanded further with an extension of the Main Library in 1997, and in 1998 it became the first library to incorporate non-Roman scripts into its electronic catalogue system. In 2004, the Durham Cathedral Library became part of the university library's management system for circulation and lending.

In October 2005, the Museums, Libraries and Archives Council designated the collections in Cosin's Library, along with the Sudan Archive in the Palace Green Library, as having "outstanding national and international significance" in the first round of the Designation Scheme to cover libraries.

A further major extension of the Main Library opened by former Chancellor Bill Bryson in 2012, and the building was renamed the Bill Bryson Library.

In 2012, the library was part of a formal partnership with Durham Cathedral and the British Library to acquire the St Cuthbert Gospel, the oldest intact book in Europe. Under the partnership agreement, this is displayed equally at the British Library and in the north east of England. The St Cuthbert Gospel was displayed alongside the Lindisfarne Gospels and other treasures of St Cuthbert at Palace Green Library in 2013.

In 2023, the library joined the SafePod Network, giving secure data access from a 'pod' installed in the Bill Bryson library to sensitive datasets from the Office for National Statistics, the UK Data Service, the Health and Care Research Wales-funded Secure Anonymised Information Linkage Databank, the Scottish Government, and Health and Social Care Northern Ireland's Honest Broker Service.

List of librarians
 1832–1834 – Patrick George
 1834–1855 – Charles Thomas Whitley
 1856–1858 – Robert Healey Blakey
 1858–1864 – Henry Frederick Long
 1865–1868 – Francis Frederick Walrond
 1869–1873 – Thomas Forster Dodd
 1873–1901 – Joseph Thomas Fowler
 1901–1934 – Edward Vazeille Stocks
 1934–1945 – Henry Waldo Acomb
 1940–1943 – Beatrice Thompson (Acting Librarian)
 1945–1967 – David Goudie Ramage
 1967–1989 – Agnes Maxwell McAulay
 1989–2009 – John Tristan Dalton Hall
 2009–2017 – Jon Purcell
 2018–present – Liz Jane Waller

Heritage, research and special collections 

As part of its collection, the library contains a wealth of printed and manuscript material with a particular wealth of material from the medieval period and the Middle East along with materials from the North East. These include:
  Middle East and Islamic Studies collections: One of the most important collections in the UK, it contains over 50,000 monographs and over 2,500 periodicals covering the Ottoman Empire to ancient Mesopotamian archaeology to modern Persian literature.
 The Sudan Archive: founded in 1957, the year after Sudanese independence, to collect and preserve the papers of administrators from the Sudan Political Service, missionaries, soldiers, business men, doctors, agriculturalists, teachers and others who had served or lived in the Sudan (now Sudan and South Sudan) during the Anglo-Egyptian Condominium (1898–1955). There is a significant amount of Mahdist material as well as papers relating to the military campaigns of the 1880s and 1890s, while in recent years, the scope of the Archive has extended to the period after independence and now contains material up to the present day. The Archive also holds substantial numbers of papers relating to Egypt, the Arabian Peninsula, Palestine, Transjordan, Syria, and African states bordering on Sudan and South Sudan. Most of the material is in English, with a small amount in Arabic. In 2005 the collection was accorded with designated status by the Museums, Libraries and Archives Council.
 Abbas Hilmi II Papers, Khedive of Egypt 1892–1914.
 Bamburgh Library Collection: Created in 1958, the collection holds some 8,500 manuscript and print titles, with 16 incunabula across a variety of subject areas. The collection was largely acquired during the mid-seventeenth and mid-eighteenth centuries by the Archbishop of York, John Sharp (1644–1714), along with three generations of the Sharp Family. The collection contains the 1533 edition of the Psalms from Freiburg and Joannes Guinterius's Anatomicarum institutionum libri.
 Bibliotheca Episcopalis Dunelmensis (Cosin Collection): Founded in 1669 by the then Bishop John Cosin. The collection contains over 5,000 titles, including nine incunabula, over 600 foreign 16th-century titles. The collection is largely in French or German and based on theological issues such as Canon law and liturgy. The collection contains Cosin's 1568 Zürich edition of Heinrich Bullinger's De origine erroris.
 Howard Collection: Contains the library of Lord William Howard of Naworth. The collection is largely of Roman Catholic texts, including a Vienna imprint of Stanislaus Hosius's Confessio catholicae fidei christiana of 1561.
 Quakerism Collection: Acquired in 1972 from the surviving collection of the Sunderland Preparative Meeting of the Society of Friends Library and contains approx. 880 printed volumes and a number of related manuscripts.
 Kellett Collection: Principally composed of the library of C. E. de M. Kellett, focusing on medicine and medical teaching. The collection contains a number of pre-18th century along with 16th and 17th-century works, including Aristotle's Totius naturalis philosophiae Aristotelis paraphrases and Galen's De sanitate tuenda alongside Vidius's Chirurgia and Estienne's De Dissectione.
 Routh Collection: Is the library of Martin Joseph Routh, president of Magdalen College, Oxford. The collection is in two sections the first on early Church Fathers entitled Reliquiae sacrae and his edition of Gilbert Burnet's History of his own time. Of the incunabula one of the most notable is Breydenbach's Itinerarium in terram sanctam. The collection contains a wealth of dating from the 14th century.
 St Chad's Collection: Deposited by St Chad's College, it contains a number of 16th and 17th-century imprints, including Quintus Aurelius Symmachus's Epistolae familiares and the Concilia omnia.
 Basil Bunting Poetry Archive: Acquired in 1987 with grants from the National Heritage Memorial Fund and the Purchase Grant Fund. It is the most extensive collection in the UK of the work of Basil Bunting (1900–1985) and of material relating to him.
 Pratt Green Collection: Is a collection founded in 1987 and contains an extensive array of hymns and hymnology. The collection was with a gift from the Pratt Green Trustees and contains work from the distinguished hymn writer, Fred Pratt Green.
 Malcolm MacDonald Papers: Papers covering the life of the former politician and chancellor of the university.
 Earl Grey Collection: Contains extensive works and papers of the former prime minister.
 Durham University Observatory Records: Contains the second-longest meteorological record in the UK from 1839 to 1953, also contains records of other local observatories.
 Medieval Seals: The collection contains many Royal and ecclesiastic devices, including Duncan I king of Scots, Henry III king of England, first great seal, and the seal of Pope Martin IV.
 Catholic National Library: Founded in 1912 and containing more than 70,000 books and over 150 runs of periodicals, this closed in 2014 due to a shortage of volunteer staff. It was transferred to Durham in 2015 following an agreement between the university and the Catholic National Library's trustees. 

Other important historical items include two copies of the first issue of the first edition of Isaac Newton's Principia, one signed by John Dalton.

Facilities 

The library has two major libraries – the Bill Bryson Library, which is the main university library, and Palace Green Library, which houses the special collections and archives. A third library, the International Study Centre Library, is located on the Queen's Campus in Stockton-upon-Tees, and is primarily used by students and staff at the International Study Centre.

In addition to these, there are study spaces in the School of Education on Leazes Road and in the Lower Mountjoy Teaching and Learning Centre, as well as a study hub in Durham University Business School (only accessible by students at the business school) that includes a reference collection of core texts.

Other resources include the Durham Cathedral archive at 5, The College, college libraries at twelve of the colleges, Durham Cathedral Library and Ushaw Colleges Library.

Bill Bryson Library
The Bill Bryson Library (known informally as the "Billy B") was built in three stages between the 1960s and 1990s, when the west wing was added. It was further extended in 2012 with the addition of a new east wing and the complete refurbishment of the rest of the library. This enabled the transfer of the music and law collections out of the Palace Green Library, allowing it to be dedicated to archives and special collections, and also provided additional study spaces for students. The library is open 24 hours a day, seven days a week, during the academic year, with staffed services available 8am to 10pm on weekdays and 9am to 10pm at weekends. There are 1,800 individual and group study spaces in the library .

Partnerships

Durham Residential Research Library
Plans to establish the first residential research library at a UK university, taking in the university's library and collections along with those of Ushaw College and Durham Cathedral, were announced in 2017. 

In 2019 a visiting fellow at the residential research library from the University of Bristol found a royal charter of King John from 1200 in the archives of Ushaw College. The discovery made the national and international news.

The residential research library takes in numerous collections and archives across Durham, including:
Palace Green Library
Bill Bryson Library
Durham University Oriental Museum
Durham University Archaeology Museum
Durham University Western Art Collection
Durham Castle Museum
Durham Cathedral Library
Other collections at Durham Cathedral
Ushaw College's library and archives
These collections include over 400 manuscripts, 40,000 early and rare printed books,  of archives, over 50,000 objects and 200 paintings.

There are three endowed visiting fellowships at the residential research library: the Barker fellowship, covering research on any of the collections, the Lendrum fellowship for research specifically on the medieval Durham Priory library, and the Holland fellowship for PhD students.

Other partnerships 
The University Library is a member of several organisation, including: 
 The Association of European Research Libraries
 OCLC
 Research Libraries UK
 The SafePod Network
 Society of College, National and University Libraries

References

External links
 Durham University Library

Buildings and structures of Durham University
Academic libraries in England
Research libraries in the United Kingdom
Libraries in County Durham
1833 establishments in England
Grade I listed buildings in County Durham